Sina Frei (born 18 July 1997) is a Swiss cross-country cyclist.

She participated at the 2018 UCI Mountain Bike World Championships, winning a medal.

On 27 July 2021, Frei won the silver medal at the 2020 Summer Olympics in Tokyo. Her teammates, Jolanda Neff and Linda Indergand won the gold and bronze medals, marking the first Swiss podium at the Olympics since 1936 and the first time a nation won all three medals in a cycling event since 1904.

Major results

Gravel

2022
 2nd  UCI World Championships

Mountain Bike

2020
 Swiss Bike Cup
1st Leukerbad
2021
 UCI World Championships
1st  Short track
3rd  Cross-country
 1st  Overall Cape Epic (with Laura Stigger)
1st Prologue, Stages 1, 2, 3, 4, 5, 6 & 7
 2nd  Cross-country, Olympic Games
 UCI XCC World Cup
2nd Les Gets
 Swiss Bike Cup
2nd Gränichen

References

External links
 
 
 

1997 births
Living people
Swiss female cyclists
Cyclists at the 2020 Summer Olympics
Olympic cyclists of Switzerland
Medalists at the 2020 Summer Olympics
Olympic medalists in cycling
Olympic silver medalists for Switzerland
21st-century Swiss women